A Vēṭṭi, also known as veshti, is a white unstitched cloth wrap for the lower body in Tamil Nadu and in the North and East of Sri Lanka (Tamil Eelam). Vēṭṭi is a part of the traditional attire consisting of Kurta and Angvastra. The garment is a single piece of cloth and similar to the dhoti, one of the earliest draped garments of India. A vēṭṭi is often layered with horizontal stripes or borders across its length.

Style
Like many wrap clothes, the vēṭṭi varies in wearing style. It is often simply wrapped around the waist, secured by a corner being tucked beneath the wrapped cloth. It is also worn as Sarong, unlike dhoti, which is looped between the legs. A belt is also used over it (less popular now) just below the closing.

Men and women both wear it. For women, the drape is known as vēṭṭi -mundu.

Political identity 
Various border (Saffron, red, green, and blue) colors of vēṭṭi represent different political parties' identities in India.

See also 
 Sari
 Tamil Nadu

References

External links

Indian clothing